Johann Julius Hecker (December 2, 1707 – June 24, 1768) was a German educator who established the first Realschule (practical high school) and Prussia's first teacher-education institution.

Hecker was born to a family of educators in Werden, then part of Prussia. As a young man, he formed an interest in theology and was drawn to pietism and the ideas of August Hermann Francke. After completing the gymnasium in Essen, he studied theology, ancient languages, medicine, and natural sciences at the University of Halle. In 1729 he became a teacher in the Francke Pädagogium, teaching every subject, including Latin, Greek, Hebrew, German, religion, history, arithmetic, botany, anatomy, physiology, and chemistry.

A sermon that Hecker delivered in 1738 so impressed Frederick William that he appointed Hecker to be the first pastor of the new Trinity Church in Berlin, which was consecrated in 1739.

In his role as pastor of Trinity Church, Hecker started six four-class elementary schools for education of the local populace. The schools were initially financed from Hecker's personal funds, a school lottery, and private donations.

In 1747 he founded the first Realschule, the "Economic-mathematical Realschule" in Berlin, in which young people who were not suited for a traditional classical education could obtain a practical education to prepare them for careers in fields such as business, manufacturing, and the fine arts. The school emphasized visual and hands-on instruction, including visits to factories and artisans' workshops, instead of rote learning.  In 1748, Hecker established a seminary for the training of teachers, the first such institution in Prussia.

Frederick William's son Frederick II (known as Frederick the Great), who became king of Prussia in 1740, was a proponent of Hecker's work. With the king's encouragement, Hecker started a garden near his school. In addition to vegetables, herbs, and fruit trees, the garden included a mulberry plantation for the purpose of silk production.

Hecker's educational work was a major influence on the formulation of Prussia's first general school law, issued by Frederick II in 1763, which formed the basis for a system of state-supported primary schools.

References

Further reading
 Fr. Ranke, Johann Julius Hecker, (Berlin, 1861)

External links
 
 

1707 births
1768 deaths
People from Essen
German educational theorists
Founders of educational institutions
Pietists
18th-century German Lutheran clergy
Martin Luther University of Halle-Wittenberg alumni
Clergy from Berlin